The Trivection oven is a convection microwave created by General Electric, which combines radiant heat, convection, and microwaves for customized cooking. According to GE, it cooks food five times faster than a traditional oven. Alton Brown, host of Good Eats, was involved in developing the oven.

In popular culture 

The product was featured in the pilot of the American situation comedy 30 Rock, in which the character Jack Donaghy describes the product, claiming to have invented it himself and pegging it as his "greatest triumph" after years and years of market research.

References

External links
The Trivection oven on GE's website

Cooking appliance brands
General Electric
Ovens